Nora is a theatre show directed by Haris Pasovic and produced by the East West Theatre Company based in Sarajevo, Bosnia and Herzegovina. The show is based on Henrik Ibsen's 1879 play A Doll's House, which was translated into Bosnian by Munib Delalic. Nora is the story of a young successful couple who seemingly live a perfect life but suffer from marital problems under the surface.

Plot
The story focuses on Nora and Torvald Helmer, who, as in Ibsen's original, are a successful married couple who live a handsome and sophisticated lifestyle. At first glance, the life of Nora and Torvald is a modern model of a happy marriage. Torvald is a rising star in the financial world who is careful to preserve the couple's public image, enjoys luxury cars and collects expensive watches. At the same time he enjoys a blissful family life, alongside an attractive wife and a five-year-old daughter. His wife Nora also enjoys shopping, clothes, shoes, perfumes, watches, exclusive brands, and luxury lingerie. Their sex life is quite liberal and extravagant.

Things change when Nora’s old friend Christine suddenly comes back into Nora’s life. From an ascetic, hard working young woman, Christine soon transforms into a femme fatale who, powered by ambition and greed, mercilessly climbs the social ladder. Her lover, Helene Krogstad (who in Ibsen’s original is a male character) blackmails both Nora and Torvald. Dr. Rank, a friend of the Helmers, is dying of a terminal disease and decides to admit to Nora and that he is in love with her. A financial crisis begins to beguile Torvald while Nora slowly loses her composure.

The show premiered in Sarajevo and toured Macedonia during the Ohrid Summer Festival. It was also played during the opening of the International Theatre Festival Desire in Subotica

Original Cast
The premiere was held on January 24, 2009 and it included the following cast:

References

Theatre in Bosnia and Herzegovina
Culture in Sarajevo
Adaptations of works by Henrik Ibsen